Japanese verbs, like the verbs of many other languages, can be phonetically modified to change their purpose, nuance or meaning – a process known as conjugation. In Japanese, the beginning of a word (the stem) is preserved during conjugation, whilst the ending of the word is altered in some way to change the meaning (this is the inflectional suffix). Japanese verb conjugations are independent of person, number and gender (they do not depend on whether the subject is I, you, he, she, we, etc.); the conjugated forms can express meanings such as negation, present and past tense, volition, passive voice, causation, imperative and conditional mood, and ability. There are also special forms for conjunction with other verbs, and for combination with particles for additional meanings.

Japanese verbs have agglutinating properties: some of the conjugated forms are themselves conjugable verbs (or i-adjectives), which can result in several suffixes being strung together in a single verb form to express a combination of meanings.

Verb groups

For Japanese verbs, the verb stem remains invariant among all conjugations. However, conjugation patterns vary according to a verb's category. For example,  and  belong to different verb categories (godan and ichidan, respectively) and therefore follow different conjugation patterns. As such, knowing a verb's category is essential for conjugating Japanese verbs.

Japanese verbs can be allocated into three categories:

 , also known as "Class‑5 verbs"
 , also known as "Class‑1 verbs"
 Irregular verbs, most notably:  and 

Verbs are conjugated from their "dictionary form", where the final kana is either removed or changed in some way. From a technical standpoint, verbs usually require a specific conjugational stem (see § Verb bases, below) for any given inflection or suffix. With godan verbs, the conjugational stem can span all five rows of the gojūon kana table (hence, the classification as a class‑5 verb). Ichidan verbs are simpler to conjugate: the final kana, which is always , is simply removed or replaced with the appropriate inflectional suffix. This means ichidan verb stems, in themselves, are valid conjugational stems which always end with the same kana (hence, the classification as a class‑1 verb).

This phenomenon can be observed by comparing conjugations of the two verb types, within the context of the gojūon table.

Unlike godan verb stems, ichidan verb stems are also functional conjugational stems, with the final kana of the stem remaining static in all conjugations.

Verb bases

Conjugable words (verbs, i‑adjectives, and na‑adjectives) are traditionally considered to have six possible  . However, as a result of the language evolving, historical sound shifts, and the post‑WWII spelling reforms, three additional sub‑bases have emerged for verbs (seen in the table below as the Potential, Volitional, and Euphonic bases). Verb bases function as the necessary stem forms to which inflectional suffixes attach.

Verbs are named and listed in dictionaries according to their . The verb group (godan, ichidan, or irregular) determines how to derive any given conjugation base for the verb. With godan verbs, the base is derived by shifting the final kana along the respective vowel row of the gojūon kana table. With ichidan verbs, the base is derived by removing or replacing the final  kana.

The table below illustrates the various verb bases across the verb groups, with the patterns starting from the dictionary form.

  The verb  has no dedicated kanōkei base. See also the § Passive: Conjugation table section below.
   is used for the spoken imperative form, while  is used for the written imperative form.
  The meaning of the term  originates from its archaic usage with the conditional  suffix in Old Japanese and Classical Japanese. The conjugated forms in the modern language, such as the passive and causative forms, do not invoke an irrealis mood, but the term mizenkei was retained.
  The mizenkei base for verbs ending in  appears to be an exceptional case with the unexpected . In modern Japanese, original instances of mid‑word consonant [w] have since been dropped before all vowels except [a].

Of the nine verb bases, the shūshikei/rentaikei, meireikei, and ren'yōkei bases can be considered fully conjugated forms without needing to append inflectional suffixes. In particular, the shūshikei/rentaikei and meireikei bases do not conjugate with any inflectional suffixes. By contrast, a verb cannot be considered fully conjugated in its kateikei, mizenkei, izenkei, kanōkei, or onbinkei base alone; a compatible inflectional suffix is required for that verb construction to be grammatical.

Certain inflectional suffixes, in themselves, take on the form of verbs or i‑adjectives. These suffixes can then be further conjugated by adopting one of the verb bases, followed by the attachment of the appropriate suffix. The agglutinative nature of Japanese verb conjugation can thus make the final form of a given verb conjugation quite long. For example, the word  is broken down into its component morphemes below:

Derivative verb bases 
There are three modern verb base forms that are considered to be derived from older forms.  These are the potential, volitional, and euphonic sub‑bases, as shown in the Verb base formation table above.

As with all languages, the Japanese language has evolved to fulfil the contemporary needs of communication. The potential form of verbs is one such example. In Old Japanese and Early Middle Japanese, potential was expressed with the verb ending , which was also used to express the passive voice ("to be done") and the spontaneous voice ("something happens on its own"). This evolved into the modern passive ending , which can similarly express potential and spontaneous senses. As usage patterns changed over time, different kinds of potential constructions emerged, such as the grammatical pattern of the rentaikei base + , and also via the kanōkei base. The lower bigrade conjugation pattern evolved into the modern ichidan pattern in modern Japanese, and these stems for godan verbs have the same form as the hypothetical stems in the table above.

Sound changes caused the resulting -amu ending to change:  →  →  (like English "ow") →  (like English "aw") → .

The ren'yōkei base also underwent various euphonic changes specific to the perfective and conjunctive (te) forms for certain verb stems, giving rise to the onbinkei or euphonic base. In the onbinkei base, the inflectional suffixes for godan verbs vary according to the last kana of the verb's ren'yōkei base.

Copula: da and desu

The copula or "to be" verb in Japanese is a special case. These are generally used to predicate sentences, equate one thing with another (i.e. "A is B."), or express a self‑directed thought (e.g. a sudden emotion or realization).

Copula: Conjugation table
The Japanese copula is not a standard 'verb' and conjugations are limited to a smaller subset of functions. Furthermore, this conjugates according to its own specific patterns:

Copula: Grammatical compatibility

Imperfective
The imperfective form (also known as the "non‑past", "plain form", "short form", "dictionary form" and the "attributive form") is broadly equivalent to the present and future tenses of English. In Japanese, the imperfective form is used as the headword or lemma. It is used to express actions that are assumed to continue into the future, habits or future intentions.

The imperfective form cannot be used to make a progressive continuous statement, such as in the English sentence "I am shopping". To do so, the verb must first be conjugated into its te form and attached to the  auxiliary verb .

Imperfective: Conjugation table
The imperfective form uses the shūshikei/rentaikei base, and is thus equivalent to the dictionary form.

Imperfective: Grammatical compatibility
The imperfective form can be used to issue prohibitive commands by attaching . For example, .
For example, .

Negative

The negative form is broadly equivalent to the English word "not".

Negative: Conjugation table
The negative form is created by using the mizenkei base, followed by the  suffix.

Negative: Grammatical compatibility
The negative form is compatible with the  particle for additional functions, such as requesting someone to cease/desist or joining a subordinate clause.

Negative continuous
In this form, the negative continuous cannot terminate a sentence. The verb has the "negative continuous tense" unless followed by the  particle, where its meaning changes to "without".

Perfective
The  is equivalent to the English "past tense".

Perfective: Conjugation table
The perfective form is created by using the onbinkei base, followed by the  suffix. (See also: Euphonic changes)

   is the only verb with the  suffix, in the entire Japanese vocabulary.

Perfective: Grammatical compatibility
The perfective form is compatible with:
  The "tari form" (or "tari‑tari form", also known as the "tari‑tari‑suru form"), to describe a non‑exhaustive list of actions (similar to  describes a non‑exhaustive lists of objects). It uses  as the subordinate conjunction.
  The "tara form" (or "past conditional"), to describe events that will happen as a result of completing something. It uses  as the subordinate conjunction.
 It can be used to mean "if" or "when";
 It can also be used to reveal an unexpected outcome that happened in the past.

te form
The {{nihongo|te form|て形|tekei}} allows verbs to function like conjunctions. Similar to the word "and" in English, the te form connects clauses to make longer sentences. Conversely, as a sentence terminal, it functions as a casual instruction (like a gentle imperative command). Finally, the te form attaches to a myriad of auxiliary verbs for various purposes.

There are limitations where the te form cannot be used to conjugate between pairs of verbs (such as when two verbs are unrelated) and the conjunctive form is used instead. 

te form: Conjugation table
The te form is created by using the onbinkei base, followed by the  suffix. (See also: Euphonic changes)

   is the only verb with the  suffix, in the entire Japanese vocabulary.
   The  form is only grammatical with verbs. It is used to emphasize negation, or otherwise used as an imperative if an auxiliary follows, e.g. .
  The  form is grammatical with adjectives and copula, but also with verbs when expressing a consequential human emotion or contradiction.

te form: Grammatical compatibility
The te form is compatible with particles for additional functions, such as giving permission or expressing prohibition.

The te form is also compatible with an extensive list of auxiliary verbs.

For example,  becomes .
  Colloquially,  undergoes morpheme fusion, becoming . For example,  becomes .

te form: Advanced usage
During speech, the speaker may terminate a sentence in the te form but slightly lengthen the vowel sound as a natural pause: . Similar to when a sentence ends with "so…" in English, this serves as a social cue that can:
 give the listener a moment to process;
 indicate the speaker is not finished speaking;
 seek permission from the listener to continue;
 imply that the listener should infer the remainder of the sentence.

Another usage of the te form is, just as with English, the order of clauses may be reversed to create emphasis. However, unlike in English, the sentence will terminate on the te form (rather than between clauses).

Conjunctive
The conjunctive form (also known as the "stem form", "masu form", "i form" and the "continuative form") functions like an intermediate conjugation; it requires an auxiliary verb to be attached since the conjunctive form is rarely used in isolation. It can also function to link separate clauses (hence the name "conjunctive") in a similar way to the te form above; however usage of the conjunctive form as a conjunction has restrictions. The conjunctive form can function as a gerund (a verb functioning as a noun) without the need for nominalizers, although permissible use cases are limited.

Conjunctive: Conjugation table
The conjunctive form uses the ren'yōkei base. It is one of the simplest conjugation patterns due to its lack of irregular conjugations. It does have an additional case for certain honorific verbs, but even those follow a consistent conjugation pattern.

  The English translations use the "-ing" suffix for nominalization. Therefore, they are nouns, not present continuous verbs.

Conjunctive: Grammatical compatibility

The conjunctive form is compatible with particles for additional functions, such as expressing purpose or a firm avoidance.

The conjunctive form is also compatible with an extensive list of auxiliary verbs. One of which, has highly irregular inflections.

Conjunctive: Advanced usage

The conjunctive form, like the te form, connects clauses in a similar way to how "and" does in English. However, the conjunctive and te forms are not usually interchangeable, and each form fulfills specific grammatical purposes. When a pair of verbs have a strong connection in context, only the te form can bridge them. When a pair of verbs are not directly related but happen during a shared period of time, only the conjunctive form can bridge them. Furthermore, if a pair of verbs are both controllable or uncontrollable in nature, the te form must bridge them; otherwise, when a verb is controllable whilst the other verb is uncontrollable, the conjunctive form must bridge them. Finally, the te and conjunctive forms are interchangeable if additional information is included between the verbs.

In the case where the conjunctive form is interchangeable with the te form, there is a stylistic means where the conjunctive form is preferred. This avoids  repetition, much like how English users might avoid saying "and…and…and…". In practice however, such a strategy is more readily accustomed to writing and more difficult to control in spoken conversation (where the te form is usually elected for every verb).

Another common usage is to form compound words, specifically compound nouns and compound verbs. As for compound nouns, the conjunctive form attaches as a prefix to another noun. Compound verbs are formed in the same way, except the conjunctive form attaches to the imperfective form.

Volitional
The volitional form (also known as the "conjectural form", "tentative form", "presumptive form" and the "hortative form") is used to express speaker's will or intention (volitional), make an inclusive command or invitation (hortative or persuasive) or to make a guess or supposition (presumptive).

Volitional: Conjugation table
The volitional form is created by using the ishikei base, followed by the  suffix.

  Theoretical conjugation only; it's unnatural and not usually used.

Volitional: Grammatical compatibility
The volitional form is also used to describe intention  an attempt  or an imminent action .

Passive
The  refocuses the verb as the target objective of a sentence; it emphasizes the action as the detail of importance. Although a sentence can include a specific subject enacting the passive verb, the subject is not required. The passive voice can nuance neutrality, a regrettable action (suffering passive) or a means of being respectful.

Passive: Conjugation table
The passive form is created by using the mizenkei base, followed by the  suffix. This makes it impossible to distinguish whether an ichidan verb adopts a passive or potential function without contextual information.

  Theoretical conjugation only; it's unnatural and not usually used.

Passive: Grammatical compatibility
After conjugating into the passive form, the verbs become ichidan verbs. They can therefore be further conjugated according to any ichidan pattern.

Causative
The  is used to express that a subject was forced or allowed to do something.

Causative: Conjugation table
The causative form is created by using the mizenkei base, followed by the  suffix.

  The causative form has a shortened variation, where the  suffix undergoes morpheme fusion and becomes ; however, the short form is less commonly used than the standard conjugation.
  Theoretical conjugation only; it's unnatural and not usually used.

Causative: Grammatical compatibility
After conjugating into the causative form, the verbs become ichidan verbs. They can therefore be further conjugated according to any ichidan pattern.

Causative passive
The causative passive form expresses that a reluctant subject was positioned (or forced) into doing something they would rather avoid. The causative passive form is obtained by conjugating a verb into its causative form and further conjugating it into the passive form. Specific to godan verbs only, the  contracts into .

Imperative
The imperative form functions as firm instructions do in English. It is used to give orders to subordinates (such as within military ranks, or towards pet animals) and to give direct instructions within intimate relationships (for example, within family or close friends). When directed towards a collective rather than an individual, the imperative form is used for mandatory action or motivational speech. The imperative form is also used in reported speech.

However, the imperative form is perceived as confrontational or aggressive when used for commands; instead, it is more common to use the te form (with or without the  suffix), or the conjunctive form's polite imperative suffix, .

Imperative: Conjugation table
The imperative form uses the meireikei base.

   is used for the spoken imperative form, while  is used for the written imperative form.
  Theoretical conjugation only; it's unnatural and not usually used.

Potential
The potential form describes the capability of doing something. It is also used to ask favors from others, just as "Can you…?" does in English. However, unlike in English, the potential form does not request permission; the phrase  is always understood to mean "Do I have the ability to eat this apple?" or "Is this apple edible?" (but never "May I eat this apple?" ).

For transitive verbs, the potential form uses the  particle to mark direct objects, instead of the  particle.

Potential: Conjugation table
The potential form is created by using the kanōkei base, followed by the  suffix.  has its own suppletive potential form . This makes it impossible to distinguish whether an ichidan verb adopts a passive or potential function without contextual information.

For example,  becomes . This contraction is specific to the potential form, and is not reciprocated in the passive form.
  Theoretical conjugation only; it's unnatural and not usually used.  expresses potential innately without having to conjugate it to the potential form.

Potential: Grammatical compatibility
After conjugating into the potential form, the verbs become ichidan verbs. They can therefore be further conjugated according to any ichidan pattern.

Conditional
The conditional form''' (also known as the "hypothetical form", "provisional form" and the "provisional conditional eba form") is broadly equivalent to the English conditionals "if…" or "when…". It describes a condition that provides a specific result, with emphasis on the condition. The conditional form is used to describe hypothetical scenarios or general truths.

Conditional: Conjugation table
The conditional form is created by using the kateikei base, followed by the  suffix.

Conditional: Advanced usage
This pattern of grammar is a double negative which loosely translates to "to avoid that action, will not''' happen". Semantically cancelling out the negation becomes "to do that action, will happen" ; however the true meaning is "I must do that action".

See also
 Japanese godan and ichidan verbs
 Honorific speech in Japanese
 Japanese adjectives
 Japanese particles
 Japanese grammar

References

Bibliography

External links

 Japanese Verb Conjugator, online tool giving all forms for any verb
 Japanese Verb Conjugator, online tool with romaji, kana, and kanji output
 JLearn.net, an online Japanese dictionary that accepts conjugated terms and returns the root verb
  Guide to conjugation te form of Japanese verbs
  List of Free Online Verb Dictionaries
  Handbook of Japanese Verbs - National Institute of Japanese Language and Linguistics

Verb conjugations
Japonic verbs

ja:活用#日本語の活用